Velesunio ambiguus, the flood plain mussel,<ref name="Aquablue">2007. [http://www.aquablueseafoods.com.au/other-mussels.shtml Freshwater Mussels - Velesunio ambiguous. Environmental Remediation of Wetlands and Dams]. Aquablue Seafoods. online, Retrieved 13 March 2009.</ref> or the billabong mussel (South Australia), is a species of freshwater bivalve in the family Hyriidae.

There are four other cryptic species in the genus Velesunio (which all look similar to Velesunio ambiguus) in Australia.

 Distribution 
Australia: Queensland, New South Wales, Victoria, and South Australia, where it is known as the billabong mussel.

 Biotope 
Static waters.

 Life cycle 
The lifespan of this clam is over 20 years.

It can survive temperatures from around 4 °C to over 30 °C.

 Human uses Velesunio ambiguus'' serves as a food for Australian Aborigines, although its flesh is tough.

This species can also be used in fish ponds to filter microscopic algae out of the water.

References

Hyriidae
Bivalves described in 1847